Enter the Game of Death (Hanja: 十字手拳), originally released as Cross Hands Martial Arts and released in North America as The King of Kung Fu, is a Bruceploitation martial arts film. This film was directed by Lee Tso-nam, who helmed previous Bruceploitation films Exit the Dragon, Enter the Tiger and Fist of Fury II. Bolo Yeung also appears as a protagonist (Yang San) beaten first at 15.02 in 'Enter the Game of Death'

Plot
There's a mysterious Chinese document that's hidden in the Tower of Death, and evil Japanese occupiers want to get their hands on it. Meanwhile, a Chinese fighter named Mr. Ang (Bruce Le) is training in the forest, only to be challenged by several Japanese fighters as well as one of the main Japanese henchmen Bolo (Bolo Yeung).  He defeats the other fighters, but flees from Bolo when he pulls out a sword. Mr. Ang and Bolo meet again in a wrestling ring, where Mr. Ang once again defeats Bolo.

Mr. Ang's victory impresses the Japanese who want to hire him to go to the Tower of Death. However, Mr. Ang is a Chinese nationalist and refuses. This leads to Mr. Ang being challenged by another group of Japanese fighters in another forest, with Mr. Ang once again reigning victorious. Shortly afterwards, Mr. Ang discovers that a woman he thought was working for the Japanese is actually an undercover Chinese agent. They make a plan to retrieve the document from the Tower of Death.

They arrive at the Tower of Death and Mr. Ang enters the tower. On the first floor he fights a monk. On the second floor he fights a man who uses snakes as weapons. On the third floor he fights a nunchaku master. On the fourth floor he fights a possessed man who attacks when a red lamp is turned on and a shaolin master. On the final floor he fights a brute. However he discovers that the document is not in the tower.

Cast
Bruce Le 
Park Dong Yong
Hoi Sang Lee
Nick Cheung Lik
Bolo Yeung
Yeo Seong
Nam Seok Hoon
Chiu Chi-ling
Kim Wang Kuk
Sim Sang Hyeon
Yeo Su Jin
Samuel Walls

Reception

The Video Vacuum gave the film two and a half stars and said: "But it's Bruce Le who kicks the most ass in his fight scenes.  Le has a lot more charisma than any of the Bruce Lee imitators and his considerable screen presence makes what would have otherwise been a lackluster action flick worth watching; making Enter the Game of Death a hair or two better than most Bruceploitation flicks."

In a double review on City on Fire, Joseph Kuby gave the film 4/10 and said: "Guaranteed, it's not really as good as some of the Bruce Li movies (e.g. The Chinese Stuntman, The Gold Connection a.k.a. Iron Dragon Strikes Back, The Lama Avengers a.k.a. The Three Avengers) nor is at as good as the official Game Of Death movies, but nonetheless Enter The Game Of Death has its moments and then some!" and Joe909 gave the film 2/10 and said: " This movie proves yet again that Bruce Le sucks, and was the worst "fake Bruce" of them all. Even Dragon Lee had some charm, compared to him. The reason behind Le's loathsomeness is the audacious levels of "action" he and his producers packed into each of his movies; plot, character development, and even dialog were cast aside whenever possible and replaced by unending kung-fu battles. At least Bruce Le was a good martial artist, with some impressive kicks, but the guy just looks too goofy with his overdone "Bruce Lee" expressions and mannerisms."

Comicbookandmoviereviews.com gave the film a C+ and said: "All in all 'Enter the Game of Death' is a film for die hard fans of this genre only. The plot is nigh on non-existent. The fights are fairly so-so by in large. Bruce and Bolo did give the overall production that extra added star power needed. But at the end of the day this flick was more Ka-rap than Ka-pow!"

References

External links
 
 

South Korean martial arts films
Hong Kong martial arts films
1978 films
1978 martial arts films
1970s martial arts films
1970s Korean-language films
1970s Cantonese-language films
Bruceploitation films
Kung fu films
Game of Death
South Korean multilingual films
Hong Kong multilingual films
1980s Hong Kong films
1970s Hong Kong films